Alcides orontes is a moth of the family Uraniidae. It is known from the Maluku Islands, including Seram Island and Ambon Island.

References 

Uraniidae
Moths of Asia
Moths described in 1763
Taxa named by Carl Linnaeus